Gauri Ganesha is a 1991 Kannada-language comedy drama film directed by Phani Ramachandra. It stars Anant Nag, Vinaya Prasad, Master Anand, Mukhyamantri Chandru, Vaishali Kasaravalli, Ramesh Bhat among others.

Anant Nag received Best Actor Filmfare Award (Kannada) for this movie. The story is based on Malladi Venkata Krishna Murthy's Telugu comedy novel Wedding Bells. The movie was remade in Telugu in 1992 as Golmaal Govindam and in Tamil in 1998 as Kumbakonam Gopalu.

Cast

 Anant Nag as Lambodhara
 Vinaya Prasad as Nurse Saraswathi
 Shruti as Gowri
 Mukhyamantri Chandru as Poornanda Rao
 Ramesh Bhat as Madhusudan alias Madhu
 Sihi Kahi Chandru as Anand Rao
 Vaishali Kasaravalli as Vishalakshi 
 Master Anand as Ganesha/ A. Ganesh/M.Ganesh/Chandramouli Jr.
 Ratnakar as neighbour
 Bengaluru Nagesh as Photo Studio owner
 Bank Janardhan as landlord
 Shivaprakash as Chandramouli 
 M. S. Umesh
 B.K. Shankar
 Shobha Raghavendra

Plot
Lambodhara is a petty trickster who cheats and lies to make a false living. One day, he turns himself into an hospital, faking an abdominal issue, solely to get free lodging and food, and also his love interest Saraswathi or Sarasu (Vinaya Prasad). At the hospital Lambodhara comes across a recent patient named Gauri who has died of heart failure. Lambodhara gets a sudden idea and he decides to take her belongings and make some money of them, but instead  finds her diary. He realizes that Gauri has come across 3 men who had significant influence in her life. The first man was her former boss who had proposed indecently to sleep with her. The second man wanted her to pretend that they are married to fool his parents in return for money for her heart treatment. The last man is a friend of the 2nd man, and thought that he had slept with her in a drunken state. The truth is that none of the men had any physical contact with her. Lambodhar devises a plan to extract money from these men and their families. He writes letters to the m stating that Gauri has given birth to their son and named him Ganesh. After a series of funny events, (such as the three booking almost neighbouring rooms on the same floor of the same hotel) all the three come to meet Lambodhar on the same day, and the film ends when Lambodhar blackmails them into submission.

Awards
Karnataka State Film Awards
 Best Male Playback Singer — Puttur Narasimha Nayak for "Nimma Maguvu Naguthiruva"
 Best Child Actor (Male) — Master Anand
 Best Dialogue — Kunigal Nagabhushan

Filmfare Awards South
 Best Film – Kannada 
 Best Actor – Kannada — Anant Nag

References

External links

1991 films
1990s Kannada-language films
Indian comedy-drama films
Films scored by Rajan–Nagendra
Kannada films remade in other languages
Films directed by Phani Ramachandra
1991 comedy-drama films